This article lists political parties in South Ossetia, a partially recognized Caucasian republic, considered by most countries to be a part of Georgia.

Current Parliamentary Parties

Current non-Parliamentary Parties

Historic Parties

References

See also
 List of political parties in Abkhazia
 List of political parties in Georgia
 Lists of political parties

South Ossetia
 
Political parties